The Stationmaster is a 1972 drama film based on the 1831 short story of the same name by Alexander Pushkin.

The film's themes include the sanctity of parental love and disappointments. Young Duniasha against her father's wishes leaves home with a young rake. The old man's life is destroyed and the daughter who disobeyed her parents is unhappy.

Cast 
 Nikolai Pastukhov as Samson Vyrin, the stationmaster
 Marianna Kushnerova as Dunya, daughter of Samson Vyrin
 Nikita Mikhalkov as Minsky, hussar
 Valentina Ananina as brewer's wife
 Anatoly Borisov  as doctor

External links
 
 Film The Stationmaster online cinema Mosfilm

1972 films
1972 drama films
Soviet drama films
Russian drama films
Films directed by Sergei Solovyov
Films based on works by Aleksandr Pushkin
Mosfilm films